Bengt Göransson (1932–2021) was a Swedish educator and social democrat politician who held different cabinet posts, including minister of culture and minister of education. He also served in the Parliament for two terms between 1985 and 1991.

Biography
Göransson was born in Södermalm in 1932. In his youth he was a member of the Swedish Social Democratic Youth League. Later he joined the Social Democratic Party. Göransson worked at the Workers' Educational Association and the People’s House.

He served as minister of culture from 1982 to 1991. During his term the Gothenburg Film Festival was launched. He was also the minister of education for two terms. He was first appointed to the post in the cabinet of Olof Palme in 1982 and remained in the office until 1989. His second term as minister of education was between 1989 and 1991. During the period 1985–1991 he represented the social democrats in the Riksdag.

In 2001 Göransson was awarded the Illis quorum. In 2006 he was awarded an honorary doctorate by the University of Gothenburg.

Göransson died on 17 June 2021.

References

External links
 

1932 births
2021 deaths
Members of the Riksdag from the Social Democrats
Members of the Riksdag 1985–1988
Members of the Riksdag 1988–1991
Politicians from Stockholm
Swedish Ministers for Education
Swedish Ministers for Culture
Recipients of the Illis quorum